Stéphane Hugues Guerinot (born 17 July 1968) is a French rower. He competed in the men's lightweight coxless four event at the 1996 Summer Olympics.

References

1968 births
Living people
French male rowers
Olympic rowers of France
Rowers at the 1996 Summer Olympics
Sportspeople from Lyon
20th-century French people